Dubberly is a village in Webster Parish, Louisiana, United States. The population was 290 at the 2000 census. It is part of the Minden Micropolitan Statistical Area.

Former Governor Robert F. Kennon was born in Dubberly in 1902 but reared in Minden. James Burton, a popular rock and roll/Country music guitarist, was born in Dubberly in 1939.

Nicholas J. Sandlin, a farmer, lawyer, journalist, district attorney, Webster Parish police juror, state representative, postmaster, Confederate States Army officer and prisoner of war, lived on a plantation near Dubberly in the 1850s. Another state representative from Dubberly, Irvin Talton, held the seat from 1880 to 1884 and was earlier a member of the Webster Parish Police Jury.

Robert L. Frye, the Republican nominee for state education superintendent in 1972, was a former principal at Dubberly High School.

Gene Reynolds, the current District 10 state representative, a Democrat, resides in Dubberly.

Joe Butler (1924-2013), father-in-law of former Webster Parish Sheriff Larkin T. Riser, was the mayor of Dubberly for sixteen years.

State Representative J. S. Bacon of nearby Heflin, who served from 1926 to 1932, is interred at Fellowship Cemetery in Dubberly.

Sgt. Joshua Tomlinson Interchange
On September 11, 2013, the Joshua B. Tomlinson Interchange at Interstate 20 and Louisiana State Highway 531 between Minden and Dubberly was dedicated in honor of United States Army sergeant Joshua Tomlinson, who was killed in the line of duty in Operation Enduring Freedom in Afghanistan. Tomlinson (born c. 1985) perished in a suicide bomb attack on May 18, 2010, while serving as part of a Personal Security Detail Detachment. He was based out of Kaiserslautern Germany in the 5th Battalion 7th Air Defense Artillery Regiment. Representative Gene Reynolds of Dubberly, who had been Tomlinson's principal at Lakeside High School, guided the bill through the Louisiana House of Representatives to honor the young soldier. "He will always be that student, with a smile and character that we would like from all our children. We now honor [him] ... with this tribute that keep his memory alive forever," said Reynolds.

Another interchange to the west on Interstate 20 at the Minden-Sibley exit is named for Iraq War hero, Army Sgt. Joshua B. Madden (1985-2006).

Geography
Dubberly is located at  (32.539634, -93.237753).

Demographics

As of the census of 2000, there were 290 people, 120 households, and 90 families residing in the village. The racial makeup of the village was 88.97% White, 10.00% African American, 0.34% Native American, and 0.69% from two or more races. Hispanic or Latino of any race were 2.41% of the population.

There were 120 households, out of which 26.7% had children under the age of 18 living with them, 67.5% were married couples living together, 7.5% had a female householder with no husband present, and 24.2% were non-families. 23.3% of all households were made up of individuals, and 12.5% had someone living alone who was 65 years of age or older. The average household size was 2.42 and the average family size was 2.86.

In the village, the population was spread out, with 20.3% under the age of 18, 9.0% from 18 to 24, 23.1% from 25 to 44, 31.4% from 45 to 64, and 16.2% who were 65 years of age or older. The median age was 43 years. For every 100 females, there were 90.8 males. For every 100 females age 18 and over, there were 87.8 males.

The median income for a household in the village was $40,417, and the median income for a family was $48,000. Males had a median income of $26,985 versus $30,333 for females. The per capita income for the village was $18,284. About 4.4% of families and 8.4% of the population were below the poverty line, including 5.9% of those under the age of eighteen and 18.0% of those 65 or over.

Coach Don Stahl
Donald R. "Don Stahl (April 17, 1937 – January 16, 1994), a Dubberly native and lifelong resident of the community, was a champion basketball coach for the Webster Parish School Board. He graduated from Centenary College in Shreveport. His 1980-1981 team won one hundred consecutive victories, a state record, and a 58-0 season, a national record. His overall record was 824-435 as a boy's coach at five different schools. In addition to Dubberly, Sibley, and Heflin, all in Webster Parish, Stahl also coached in Homer in Claiborne Parish and St. Martinville in St. Martin Parish. At Sibley High School (since Lakeside High School), his teams won state titles in 1978 and 1979.

Stahl also coached girls' basketball, in which capacity, he amassed more than one hundred wins. In 1979 and 1980, Stahl received "Louisiana Coach of the Year" designation. He was an All-Star coach in 1979. He was scheduled to be inducted into the Louisiana High School Athletic Association Hall of Fame January 26, but died ten days earlier.

He was also deputy Webster Parish tax assessor and a member of Brushwood United Methodist Church in Dubberly. He and his wife, Priscilla C. Stahl (born March 1943), had three daughters and sons-in-law, Ann and Clyde Heard of Dubberly, Janet and Tommy Thompson of Minden, and Susan and Billy Reeves, also of Minden. He is interred at Brushwood Cemetery in Dubberly.

Don Stahl's brother, Harry Doyce Stahl (1941-2017), also graduated from Centenary College and owned Stahl Finance and Loans in Minden, which made smaller loans to customers than banks would handle, and later formed with his two sons, Douglas and Davis Stahl, Ark-La-Tex Collision Specialists, Inc., a business still in operation in Minden. He too is interred at Brushwood Cemetery.

References

Villages in Louisiana
Villages in Webster Parish, Louisiana